Gol Khandan Rural District is in Bumehen District of Pardis County, Tehran province, Iran. At the National Censuses of 2006 and 2011, its constituent parts were in the Central District of Tehran County. The cities of Bumahen and Pardis, and most of Siyahrud Rural District separated from Tehran County on 29 December 2012 to establish Pardis County with two districts: Bumehen District and Jajrud District.

At the most recent census of 2016, the population of the rural district was 1,550 in 509 households. The largest of its six villages was its capital, Gol Khandan-e Qadim, with 553 people. After the census, Karasht Rural District and the city of Pardis separated from the district to establish the Central District, with two rural districts and the city of Pardis as its capital.

References 

Pardis County

Rural Districts of Tehran Province

Populated places in Tehran Province

Populated places in Pardis County